Air Marshal Sadasivan Radhakrishnan PVSM, AVSM, is a retired officer in the Indian Air Force. He served as Air Officer Commanding-in-Chief (AOC-in-C), Southern Air Command. Previously he served as  Commander-in-Chief, Andaman and Nicobar Command and also served as  a Senior Air Staff Officer (SASO) of the Indian Air Force’s Bangalore based Training Command.  An alumnus of the National Defence Academy, he was commissioned into the IAF in June 1970 in the fighter stream.  He has the experience of over 4000 hours of flying on a variety of combat and trainer aircraft.  He is a Qualified Flying Instructor and a fighter Combat Leader.

He superannuated on 31 August 2009 after a distinguished service of 39 years.

Honours and decorations 
During his career, Sadasivan Radhakrishnan has been awarded the Ati Vishisht Seva Medal (AVSM) and the Param Vishisht Seva Medal service.

External links

Indian Air Force air marshals
Living people
Recipients of the Ati Vishisht Seva Medal
Indian Air Force officers
Year of birth missing (living people)
Recipients of the Param Vishisht Seva Medal